Cleptometopus sikkimensis is a species of beetle in the family Cerambycidae. It was described by Breuning in 1971.

References

sikkimensis
Beetles described in 1971